This is a list of public art in Floyd County, Indiana.

This list applies only to works of public art accessible in an outdoor public space. For example, this does not include artwork visible inside a museum.

Most of the works mentioned are sculptures. When this is not the case (e.g., sound installation,) it is stated next to the title.

Mount St. Francis

New Albany

Notes

Tourist attractions in Floyd County, Indiana
Floyd County
Floyd County, Public art